Daniel Finlayson (born 19 January 2001) is a professional footballer who plays as a defender for Linfield, on loan from St Mirren.

Career

Rangers
Finlayson came through the youth system at Rangers. In February 2020 he moved on loan to USL Championship club Orange County alongside Cammy Palmer and Matthew Shiels, as part of a partnership between Rangers and Orange County. He made his league debut for the club on 16 July 2020 against Phoenix Rising.

St Mirren 
On 5 October 2020, Finlayson returned to Scotland to join St Mirren on a season-long loan deal with an option to buy for an undisclosed fee. St Mirren announced on 21 May 2021 that they had exercised this option and had signed Finlayson to a two-year contract. He was loaned to Kelty Hearts in October 2021.

In June 2022, Finlayson was loaned out to Linfield until the end of the season.

Career statistics

References

External links
Daniel Finlayson at Sofa Score

2001 births
Living people
Orange County SC players
USL Championship players
Scottish footballers
Northern Ireland youth international footballers
Association football defenders
Rangers F.C. players
St Mirren F.C. players
Expatriate soccer players in the United States
Scottish Professional Football League players
Kelty Hearts F.C. players
Linfield F.C. players